Karl Wlaschek (4 August 1917 – 31 May 2015) was the founder of the Austrian supermarket chain Billa. According to the magazine "Trend", Mr. Wlaschek was one of the 5 richest Austrians. In 1996 he sold Billa for 1.1 billion euros.

Personal life
He lived in Vienna with his fifth wife and had two children.

Further reading 
 Adolf Haslinger: Karl Wlaschek. Eine Erfolgsgeschichte. Niederösterreichisches Pressehaus, November 2005,

See also 
 The World's Billionaires
 Liste der reichsten Österreicher

References

External links 
 Kurzbiografie

Businesspeople from Vienna
Austrian billionaires
1917 births
2015 deaths